Trey Edwin Bruce is an American songwriter. Bruce has written ten Number One singles on the Billboard. "Look Heart, No Hands", "Spirit of a Boy, Wisdom of a Man" and "Whisper My Name" by Randy Travis, and "How Your Love Makes Me Feel" by Diamond Rio, "A Little Bit of You" by Lee Roy Parnell among others. He has also co-written numerous singles for other artists, including Faith Hill, Leann Rimes, Trisha Yearwood and Trace Adkins, Reba McEntire, Carrie Underwood. Bruce received a Daytime Emmy Award for Best Original Song in 2001 along with co-writers John Bettis and Brian D. Siewart.

Biography
Bruce's musical career began at an early age, when he played drums at various clubs around Memphis, Tennessee. In 1989, he moved to Nashville, Tennessee and signed with MCA Music Publishing as a songwriter. His first hit as a songwriter came in 1990, when Shelby Lynne reached the U.S. Hot Country Singles & Tracks charts with "Things Are Tough All Over"; in 1993, Randy Travis reached Number One on the same chart with Bruce's "Look Heart, No Hands". (Travis also recorded two more songs written by Bruce: 1994's "Whisper My Name" and 1998's "Spirit of a Boy, Wisdom of a Man".)

He is the son of singer Ed Bruce and songwriter Patsy Bruce. His daughter, Sela Bruce, is a singer-songwriter. (Royalty Network)

References

American country songwriters
American male songwriters
Record producers from Tennessee
Emmy Award winners
Living people
People from Memphis, Tennessee
Songwriters from Tennessee
Year of birth missing (living people)